Frank Dikötter is a Dutch historian who specialises in modern China. Dikötter has been Chair Professor of Humanities at the University of Hong Kong since 2006. Before relocating to Hong Kong, he was Professor of the Modern History of China at the School of Oriental and African Studies at the University of London. He holds an honorary doctorate from Leiden University and is a senior fellow at the Hoover Institution of Stanford University.

Work
In Patient Zero (2003) and Narcotic Culture (2004), Dikötter posits that the impact of the prohibition of opium on the Chinese people led to greater harm than the effects of the drug itself. These works have been poorly received by academics, with historian Kathleen L. Lodwick saying that "Narcotic Culture appears to be one of the revisionist histories of which there have been several lately that have aimed at convincing us that imperialism wasn't all that bad, or at least that we should not blame the imperialists, in this case the opium traders who made vast fortunes from the trade, for the social problems they created. Closer attention to accuracy in the bibliography would have caught some errors, which appear more than once and so are not simply typos." Alan Baumler wrote in his review of Narcotic Culture, "the authors' unwillingness to engage with the secondary literature, poor conceptualization, and questionable use of evidence make the study less useful than it could be." Timothy Brook wrote that the authors of Narcotic Culture "float some extraordinary propositions that go not only beyond received wisdom, but beyond actual evidence and even common sense."

The People's Trilogy

Dikötter is the author of The People's Trilogy, three books that document the impact of Communist-led China on the lives of ordinary people on the basis of new archival material. The first volume, titled Mao's Great Famine, won the 2011 Samuel Johnson Prize (now called the Baillie Gifford Prize) for nonfiction, Britain's most prestigious book award for non-fiction, in 2010. The second installment, The Tragedy of Liberation: A History of the Chinese Revolution, 1945–1957, was shortlisted for the Orwell Prize in 2014, losing out to This Boy by Alan Johnson. The Cultural Revolution: A People's History, 1962–1976, concludes the trilogy and was shortlisted for the PEN International Hessell-Tiltman Prize in 2017.

In 2010, Pankaj Mishra described Dikötter's work as "boldly and engagingly revisionist", leading to a public dispute between the two. In 2011, Roderick MacFarquhar said that Mao's Great Famine is "Pathbreaking ... a first-class piece of research. ... [Mao] will be remembered as the ruler who initiated and presided over the worst man-made human catastrophe ever. His place in Chinese history is assured. Dikötter's book will have done much to put him there." Felix Wemheuer, lecturer in Chinese history and politics at the University of Vienna, in his review of Mao's Great Famine, criticized Dikötter for his book's lack of explanation of local variations in destruction and death toll, his ignorance of Mao's efforts to deal with the problems, and his lack of sophisticated arguments due to his political agenda: to reduce Chinese Communism to terror.

In his review of The Tragedy of Liberation, Wemheuer wrote, "Dikötter is retelling an old story about the early years of the Cold War based on new sources. While many journalists celebrate The Tragedy of Liberation in their reviews, most Western historians, political scientists, and sociologists offer a much more complicated version of early PRC history that includes diverse experiences and local variations. Finding credible alternative narratives is a huge task that warrants future research by modern China scholars. Unfortunately, Dikötter's condemning of the Chinese revolution in his People's Trilogy requires an academic response that consists of more than a few novel local case studies." Adam Cathcart, lecturer in Chinese history at the University of Leeds, has pointed out Dikötter's problematic use of sources. Brian DeMare has criticized Dikötter's The Tragedy of Liberation for implying that landlords were a communist-invented fiction. DeMare writes, "Due to Dikötter's choice of phrasing, many readers believe that he is arguing that there were no landlords in China. His citation, however, refers to my UCLA dissertation, where I discuss how the term land lord (dizhu) was an alien word in the countryside [...] There were, to be sure, many landlords in China."

In his review, Ian Johnson wrote about Dikötter's lack of nuance and the absence of grounding for his contrarian views (for example, Dikötter wrote that literacy and public health decreased during the Mao period). Mao Zedong's biographer Philip Short wrote that "Dikötter's errors are strangely consistent. They all serve to strengthen his case against Mao and his fellow leaders." In reference to Dikötter's errors and misleading comments, Short said the main problem with Dikötter's book was that it did not offer a credible explanation of why Mao and his colleagues acted as they did. Short posited that Dikötter's book "set out to make the case for the prosecution, rather than providing balanced accounts of the periods they describe."

Awards
 2011: Samuel Johnson Prize for Mao's Great Famine
 2017: honorary doctorate from Leiden University

List of works

 1992: The Discourse of Race in Modern China – digital edition
 1995: Sex, Culture and Modernity in China: Medical Science and the Construction of Sexual Identities in the Early Republican Period
 1997: The Construction of Racial Identities in China and Japan
 1998: Imperfect Conceptions: Medical Knowledge, Birth Defects and Eugenics in China
 2002: Crime, Punishment and the Prison in Modern China
 2003: Patient Zero: China and the Myth of the Opium Plague – digital edition
 2004: Narcotic Culture: A History of Drugs in China
 2007: Exotic Commodities: Modern Objects and Everyday Life in China
 2008: The Age of Openness: China Before Mao
 2010: Mao's Great Famine: The History of China's Most Devastating Catastrophe, 1958–1962
 2013: The Tragedy of Liberation: A History of the Chinese Revolution, 1945–1957
 2016: The Cultural Revolution: A People's History, 1962–1976
 2019: How to Be a Dictator: The Cult of Personality in the Twentieth Century
 2022: China After Mao: The Rise of a Superpower

See also
 Cultural Revolution
 Great Leap Forward
 History of the People's Republic of China (1949–1976)
 Mao Zedong

References

External links
 

1961 births
Academics of SOAS University of London
Academic staff of the University of Hong Kong
Alumni of SOAS University of London
Dutch expatriates in Hong Kong
20th-century Dutch historians
Dutch sinologists
Hoover Institution people
Living people
People from Stein, Limburg
University of Geneva alumni
Historians of the Cultural Revolution